ANF Architects, formerly Askew Nixon Ferguson Architects and originally Lee Askew and Associates, is a Memphis, Tennessee based architectural firm established in 1975. It is led by Lee Askew III, a Fellow (FAIA) at the American Institute of Architects.  The founders were Lee H. Askew, William B. Ferguson, William Nixon and Butch Wolfe.

In 1982 the firm became Askew Nixon Ferguson Wolfe. It became Askew Nixon Ferguson Architects in 1998. In 2008, the firm was run by eight partners, including Askew and Ferguson, and employed about thirty registered architects.

Its office building features a gallery which displays monthly art shows of local Memphis artists.

The work of ANF Architects includes museums, civic projects,, high-design retail stores, and university projects.

Notable projects
University of Memphis, School of Law campus, re-purposing, retrofitting and interior design work.

Awards

 Design Award of Excellence, American Institute of Architects
 Award of Honor, American Institute of Architects
 Award of Excellence, American Institute of Architects
 Design Award, American Institute of Architects
 Design Award, Progressive Architecture Magazine
 Honorable Mention for Design, American Institute of Architects
 Educational Design Excellence, American School and University Magazine

References

External links
Official site

Architecture firms based in Tennessee
Companies based in Memphis, Tennessee